Juan José Castillo may refer to:
Juan José Castillo (footballer, born 1955), Spanish footballer
Juan José Castillo (footballer, born 1980), Guatemalan footballer

See also
Juan José Castilla (born 1945), Mexican pentathlete